Ellen Klages (born 1954) is an American science, science fiction and historical fiction writer who lives in San Francisco. Her novelette "Basement Magic" won the 2005 Nebula Award for Best Novelette. She had previously been nominated for Hugo, Nebula, and Campbell awards. Her first (non-genre) novel, The Green Glass Sea, was published by Viking Children's Books in 2006. It won the 2007 Scott O'Dell Award for Historical Fiction.  Portable Childhoods, a collection of her short fiction published by Tachyon Publications, was named a 2008 World Fantasy Award Finalist. White Sands, Red Menace, the sequel to The Green Glass Sea, was published in Fall 2008.  In 2010 her short story "Singing on a Star" was nominated for a World Fantasy Award.  In 2018 her novella Passing Strange was nominated for the Mythopoeic Fantasy Award for Adult Literature.

Biography 
Ellen Janeway Klages was born in Columbus, Ohio, on July 9, 1954, and now lives in San Francisco. She holds a degree in philosophy from the University of Michigan. In 1992, she began working at the San Francisco Exploratorium, where she was selected to co-author a children's science activity book with science fiction author Pat Murphy. Murphy encouraged Klages to write her own stories as well. Her first novelette, "Time Gypsy", was published in 1999 and was a finalist for the Nebula Award and Hugo Award. She was also nominated for the John W. Campbell Award for Best New Writer in 2000. Besides her writing, she also graduated from the Second City Conservatory, the Clarion South Workshop, and has served on the Motherboard of the James Tiptree Jr. Award for twenty years.

Klages is also known for doing stand-up comedy and other performances as an auctioneer annually at WisCon. The WisCon Tiptree Auction is a fundraiser for the James Tiptree, Jr. Award; Klages also serves on the Board for the award. "At past Tiptree auctions, auctioneer/comedian Ellen Klages has auctioned off her own hair, Mary Doria Russell's brassiere, a hand-knitted uterus, a kangaroo-scrotum purse, a cherry pie, and a Xena lawn butt". Klages was a Guest of Honor at Wiscon 33.

Bibliography

Science fiction and fantasy

Collections 
 Portable Childhoods, short fiction collection (Tachyon Publications, 2007)
"Basement Magic" (2003 novelette)
"Intelligent Design" (2005 short story)
"The Green Glass Sea" (2004 short story)
"Clip Art" (2007 short story)
"Triangle" (2001 short story)
"The Feed Bag" (2003 poem)
"Flying Over Water" (2000 short story)
"Möbius, Stripped of a Muse" (2007 short story)
"Time Gypsy" (1998 novelette)
"Be Prepared" (2002 short fiction)
"Travel Agency" (2002 short story)
"A Taste of Summer" (2002 short story)
"Ringing Up Baby" (2006 short story)
"Guys Day Out" (2005 short story)
"Portable Childhoods" (2007 novelette)
"In the House of the Seven Librarians" (2006 novelette)
Wicked Wonders, short fiction collection (Tachyon Publications, 2017)
 Introduction by Karen Joy Fowler
 The Education of a Witch
 Amicae Aeternum
 Mrs. Zeno's Paradox
 Singing on a Star
 Hey, Presto
 Echoes of Aurora
 Friday Night at St. Cecilia's
 Caligo Lane
 Goodnight Moons
 Gone to the Library
 Household Management
 Sponda the Suet Girl and the Secret of the French Pearl
 Woodsmoke
 The Scary Ham
 Afterword: Why I Write Short Fiction

Novellas 

 Passing Strange (Tor.com, 2017). (Nominated Mythopoeic Fantasy Award for Adult Literature)

Novelettes 
 "Time Gypsy", Bending the Landscape: Science Fiction, edited by Nicola Griffith and Stephen Pagel (Overlook Press, 1999) (Nebula Award Finalist; Hugo Award Finalist)
 "Basement Magic", The Magazine of Fantasy & Science Fiction, May 2003 (2005 Nebula Award winner)
 "In the House of the Seven Librarians", Firebirds Rising, edited by Sharyn November (Viking, April, 2006)

Short stories 
 "Flying Over Water", Lady Churchill's Rosebud Wristlet #7 (October, 2000) (Nebula Award Finalist)
 "Triangle", Bending the Landscape: Horror, edited by Nicola Griffith and Stephen Pagel (Overlook Press, 2001) (Spectrum Award Finalist)
 "Travel Agency", Strange Horizons (February 2002)
 "A Taste of Summer", Black Gate #3 (Winter, 2002)
 "Be Prepared", The Infinite Matrix (Sept, 2002)
 "Green Glass Sea", Strange Horizons (September, 2004)
 "Intelligent Design", Strange Horizons (December 2005)
 "Guys Day Out", Sci Fiction (April 2005)
 "Ringing Up Baby", Nature (April, 2006)
 "Friday Night at St. Cecilia's", The Coyote Road, edited by Ellen Datlow and Terri Windling (Viking Juvenile, 2007)
 "Mrs. Zeno's Paradox", Eclipse One, edited by Jonathan Strahan (Night Shade Books, Oct 2007)
 "Echoes of Aurora", What Remains, with Geoff Ryman (Aqueduct Press, 2009), The Best Science Fiction and Fantasy of the Year Volume Four, edited by Jonathan Strahan (Night Shade Books, Mar 2010)
 "Singing on a Star", Firebirds Soaring, edited by Sharyn November (Viking, 2009). (World Fantasy Award Nominee for Best Short Story 2010)
 "A Practical Girl", Eclipse Three: New Science Fiction and Fantasy, edited by Jonathan Strahan (Night Shade Books, Oct 2009)
 "Goodnight Moons", Life on Mars: Tales from the New Frontier, ed. Jonathan Strahan (Viking, April 2011); The Best Science Fiction and Fantasy of the Year Volume Six, ed. Jonathan Strahan (Night Shade Books, Mar 2012)
 "The Education of a Witch", Under My Hat: Tales from the Cauldron, ed. Jonathan Strahan (Random House, Aug 2012)
 "Amicae Aeternum", Reach for Infinity, ed. Jonathan Strahan (2014)

Historical fiction 
 The Green Glass Sea (Viking Children's Books, 2006). (Winner Scott O'Dell Award for Historical Fiction 2007)
White Sands, Red Menace (Viking Children's Books, 2008)
 Out of Left Field (Viking Children's Books, 2018)

Non-fiction 
 Harbin Hot Springs: Healing Waters, Sacred Land (HS Publishing, Inc., 1991)
 The Science Explorer: The Best Family Activities and Experiments from the World's Favorite Hands-On Science Museum, with Pat Murphy, Linda Shore (Henry Holt & Co., 1996)
 The Science Explorer Out and About: Fantastic Science Experiments Your Family Can Do Anywhere, with Pat Murphy, Linda Shore (Henry Holt & Co., 1997)
 Exploratorium: A Year of Discoveries (Chronicle Books, 1997)
 The Brain Explorer: Puzzles, Riddles, Illusions, and other Mental Adventures, with Pat Murphy, Linda Shore and Pearl Tesler (Henry Holt & Co., 1999)

References

External links 
 
 
 

1954 births
American science fiction writers
American historical novelists
Nebula Award winners
World Fantasy Award-winning writers
University of Michigan alumni
Writers from the San Francisco Bay Area
21st-century American novelists
American women short story writers
American women novelists
Living people
Women science fiction and fantasy writers
21st-century American women writers
Writers from Columbus, Ohio
21st-century American short story writers
Novelists from Ohio